Joseph James Dermody (born 24 September 1972) was an Irish sportsperson. He hurled for his local club St Lachtain's and was a member of the Kilkenny senior inter-county team from 1997 until 1999.

Honours
St Lachtain's
Kilkenny Junior Hurling Championship (1): 1993

Kilkenny
Leinster Senior Hurling Championship (1): 1998

References

1972 births
Living people
Hurling goalkeepers
Kilkenny inter-county hurlers
St Lachtain's hurlers